Pullicino is a Maltese and Italian surname. Notable people with the surname include:

 Alberto Pullicino, Maltese painter
 George Pullicino, Maltese politician
 Giorgio Pullicino, Maltese painter, architect, and professor of drawing and architecture
 Jeffrey Pullicino Orlando, Maltese politician
 Joseph Said Pullicino, Chief Justice of Malta
 Peter Pullicino, footballer

References 

Maltese-language surnames
Italian-language surnames